Hammerbox is the debut studio album from Seattle rock band Hammerbox.

Track listing
All songs written and arranged by Hammerbox. 
 "Bred" – 3:04  
 "Size of the World" – 3:20  
 "When 3 Is 2" – 4:08  
 "We" – 2:32  
 "Ask Why" – 3:39 
 "Under the Moon" – 3:56  
 "Texas Ain't So Bad, Really" – 1:57  
 "Their Given Voice" – 4:14  
 "Woke Up" – 5:24  
 "Kept House" – 4:06

Personnel
Carrie Akre: Vocals, Tambourine
Harris Thurmond: Guitars, Vocals
James Atkins: Bass
Dave Bosch: Drums, Percussion, Vocals

Production
Produced by Hammerbox and Ed Brooks; assistant producer: Steve Manning
Tracks 1-8 recorded and mixed by Ed Brooks; with assistance by Sam Hoftstedt
Tracks 9-10 recorded by Rich Hinklin; remixed by Ed Brooks
All songs published by Hammerbox Music.

References

1991 debut albums
Hammerbox albums
Grunge albums
Albums recorded at Robert Lang Studios